Iveta Voralová (born 7 August 1970) is a former figure skater who represented Czechoslovakia. She won bronze at the 1986 Karl Schäfer Memorial, placed ninth at the 1987 European Championships, and competed at the 1988 Winter Olympics, finishing 20th.

Competitive highlights

References 

1970 births
Czechoslovak female single skaters
Living people
Olympic figure skaters of Czechoslovakia
Figure skaters at the 1988 Winter Olympics